Xing'er Township (Mandarin: 杏儿藏族乡) is a township in Minhe Hui and Tu Autonomous County, Haidong, Qinghai, China. In 2010, Xing'er Township had a total population of 4,088: 2,074 males and 2,074 females: 1,057 aged under 14, 2,782 aged between 15 and 65 and 249 aged over 65.

References 

Township-level divisions of Qinghai
Haidong
Ethnic townships of the People's Republic of China